Yellow rattlesnake may refer to:
 Timber rattlesnake or Crotalus horridus, a pitviper species found in the eastern United States
 Crotalus concolor or midget faded rattlesnake, a pitviper species found in the western United States
 Eastern diamondback rattlesnake or Crotalus adamanteus, a pitviper species found in the eastern United States

Animal common name disambiguation pages